Monck was an electoral riding in Ontario, Canada. It was created in 1867 at the time of confederation and was abolished in 1914. It was merged into the riding of Lincoln.

Members of Provincial Parliament

References

Former provincial electoral districts of Ontario